The 1972 Manly-Warringah Sea Eagles season was the 26th in the club's history since their entry into the then New South Wales Rugby Football League premiership in 1947. After 5 previous Grand Final losses, the Sea Eagles broke through for their first premiership win.

The 1972 Sea Eagles were coached by former Australian international and Manly fullback Ron Willey. Captaining the side was long serving hooker Fred Jones. The club competed in the New South Wales Rugby Football League's 1972 Premiership season and played its home games at the 20,000 capacity Brookvale Oval.

Ladder

Regular season

Finals

Major Semi-Final

Grand Final

After twenty-five years in the competition and five Grand Final losses, Manly finally broke through to win the club's first NSWRFL premiership.

In a controversial match, the Sea-Eagles downed the Eastern Suburbs Roosters 19 to 14, thus shedding their 'bridesmaids' tag. The Roosters were highly critical of referee Keith Page after the match, claiming both of Manly's tries shouldn't have been awarded. To add to their rage, Easts crossed for 2 tries that were disallowed.

A dour first half saw the teams go to the break at 4-all, before a try by hooker Fred Jones put Manly ahead. Jones appeared to drop the ball as he attempted to ground it, but was awarded the try nonetheless. For his part Jones contends that he did place the ball with downward pressure. Midway through the second half, controversy flared again when Manly centre Ray Branighan appeared to stop over the Eastern Suburbs try line after accepting what looked like a forward pass from prop Bill Hamilton. However, referee Page allowed it and the Manly fans began celebrating, knowing that at 19-4 their first premiership victory was assured. Although Easts fought back with two late tries to John Ballesty and Bill Mullins and brought the score to 19-14, time ran out for the Roosters and Manly had won their first ever premiership in first grade.

In the end, it was Manly's part-time goal kicker Ray Branighan who proved the difference, kicking 6 goals from 8 attempts.

Player statistics
Note: Games and (sub) show total games played, e.g. 1 (1) is 2 games played.

Representative Players

International

 Australia – Ray Branighan, Bob Fulton, Fred Jones, John O'Neill, Dennis Ward

State
 New South Wales – Bob Fulton, Bill Hamilton, Ian Martin, Terry Randall

References

External links
Manly Warringah Sea Eagles official website
National Rugby League official website

Manly Warringah Sea Eagles seasons
Manly-Warringah Sea Eagles season
Manly-Warringah Sea Eagles season